Michele Boscacci (born 4 January 1990) is an Italian ski mountaineer.

Boscacci, son of Graziano Boscacci, was born in Sondalo, and started skiing when he was five years old. In 2004 he competed at his first Pierra Menta race, when he was fourteen years old. A few years later he became a member of the national youth team.

He is a member of the Polisportiva Albosaggia.

Selected results 
 2010:
 1st (juniors), Trophée des Gastlosen (ISMF World Cup), together with Robert Antonioli
 2011:
 8th, World Championship single race
 3rd, Trofeo Mezzalama, together with Marc Pinsach Rubirola and Robert Antonioli
 9th, Pierra Menta, together with Robert Antonioli
 2012:
 4th, European Championship team, together with Damiano Lenzi
 1st, Sellaronda Skimarathon, together with Lorenzo Holzknecht
 2nd, Mountain Attack
 Stagione 2012-2013:
 Campionato italiano vertical	           U23 1° assoluto 1°
 Campionato italiano individuale	   U23 2° assoluto 8°
 Classifica finale di coppa del mondo	   U23 2° assoluto 10°
 Campionato italiano a coppie	 	   U23 1°
 Campionato del mondo staffetta	          assoluto 2°
 Campionato del mondo vertical	   U23 2° assoluto 8°
 Campionato del mondo individuale	   U23 3° assoluto 9°
 Pierramenta	                           U23 1° assoluto 6°
 Adamello ski ride	 	                  assoluto 3°
 Trofeo mezzalama	 	                  assoluto 3°

External links 
 Michele Boscacci at skimountaineering.org
 Personal website

References 

1990 births
Living people
Italian male ski mountaineers
People from Sondrio
Italian sky runners
Sportspeople from the Province of Sondrio